Brian Cairns (13 June 1940 – 1 October 1993) was a Welsh professional darts player.

Darts career
Cairns played in the BDO World Darts Championship twice. In 1987, he beat 1983 World Champion Keith Deller in the first round but lost in the second round to Sweden's Lars Erik Karlsson. In 1990 he returned to the Lakeside, beating Scotland's Mike Veitch in the first round but lost in the second round to another Swede, Magnus Caris.

Cairns also played in the 1989 Winmau World Masters, losing in the first round to Denmark's Troels Rusel. It was the same year that Cairns captured his biggest title, the British Open. He beat Phil Taylor in the quarter finals and in the semi finals beat Ray Battye. He took the title by beating Martin Hurley, who had beaten Bob Anderson and Cliff Lazarenko en route to the final.

Cairns last played in the 1992 Welsh Open, reaching the quarter-final stage.

Bullseye
Cairns appeared twice on television show Bullseye, scoring 340 on both occasions with nine darts when attempting to win the Bronze Bully.

Death
Cairns died on 1 October 1993.

References

External links
Brian Cairns' profile and stats on Darts Database

1993 deaths
Welsh darts players
Place of birth missing
1940 births
British Darts Organisation players